Maria Bohm may refer to:

 Maria Böhm,  Austrian who was awarded the title Righteous Among The Nations
 Maria Bohm (weightlifter) (born 1974), Swedish weightlifter